The Monastery of St. Nicholas of Badova or Bantova is a former Eastern Orthodox monastery that is part of the Meteora monastery complex in Thessaly, central Greece.

History
The monastery was founded around the year 1400 in a rock cave on Badovas Rock. In 1943, it was bombed by the Luftwaffe.

Gallery

References

Meteora